State Road 102 (NM 102) is a state highway in the US state of New Mexico. NM 102's western terminus is at NM 39 east-southeast of Mosquero, and the eastern terminus is north of Amistad at NM 402.

History
New Mexico State Road 102 originally went between the current NM 402 (then NM 18) and Sedan in the 1940s. In the following decade, the road was extended southward over old NM 57 and old NM 171, overlapping then-NM 18, then westward through Bueyeros and eastward to the state line meeting up with Texas's SH 102. In 1988 during the New Mexico highway system renumbering, NM 102 took over old NM-65 (which is now NM 420) and the former portion of the route from NM 402 to the Texas state line became NM 421.

Major intersections

See also

References

102
Transportation in Harding County, New Mexico
Transportation in Union County, New Mexico